The CCM2 gene contains 10 coding exons and an alternatively spliced exon 1B.  This gene is located on chromosome 7p13  and loss of function mutations on CCM2 lead to the onset of Cerebral Cavernous Malformations (CCM) illness.  Cerebral cavernous malformations (CCMs) are vascular malformations in the brain and spinal cord made of dilated capillary vessels.

Protein
Malcavernin is a protein that in humans is encoded by the CCM2 gene. The normal function of malcavernin is to act as a scaffold for a variety of signaling complexes including p38 MAP Kinase.  This protein is also involved in regulating the cellular localization of the KRIT1 protein and acts with the Rho Kinase signaling pathway to maintain normal blood vessel structure.

Advocacy
For more information and support for Cerebral Cavernous Malformations Patients and their families, please visit the Angioma Alliance website: www.angioma.org

References

External links

Further reading